Rim Hassan (born December 3, 1968) is an Egyptian Olympic diver. She represented Egypt in 1984 Summer Olympics in Los Angeles.

Olympic participation

Los Angeles 1984 
Hassan was the youngest and the only female participants for Egypt's diving team in that tournament aged only 15 years and 246 days then.
 Diving – Women's 3 metre springboard

 Diving – Women's 10 metre platform

References

1968 births
Egyptian female divers
Olympic divers of Egypt
Divers at the 1984 Summer Olympics
Living people